InterContinental London Park Lane is a luxury five-star hotel in London, England operated by the InterContinental Hotels Group.

History
The hotel is built on the site of a series of townhouses that included 145 Piccadilly, the childhood home of Queen Elizabeth II. The townhouses were destroyed in World War II. The hotel was designed by Sir Frederick Gibberd. It was officially opened by Valerian Wellesley, 8th Duke of Wellington on 23 September 1975 as the Inter-Continental London.

The hotel underwent a 75 million refurbishment in 2007. In 2013, InterContinental Hotels Group sold the hotel for 301.5 million to Constellation Hotels, a division of the Qatar Investment Authority, which simultaneously bought the freehold to the land under the hotel for 100 million from the Crown Estate. The hotel continues to be managed by InterContinental under a thirty-year contract, with three additional ten-year extension options.

Facilities
InterContinental London Park Lane has 449 rooms, including 71 expansive suites. It has a dedicated conference floor, including a ballroom.

InterContinental London Park Lane has three restaurants. The main dining restaurant has been run by chef Theo Randall since 2006. Other food and drink services in the building include the Wellington Lounge and the Arch Bar.

Awards
The hotel was named England’s Leading Conference Hotel by the World Travel Awards in 2016, and the UK's Best Business Hotel by Business Traveller in 2020.

References

External links

History, design, review and photos of the InterContinental London Park Lane by cosmopolis.ch

Hotels in London
InterContinental hotels
Hotels established in 1975
Hotel buildings completed in 1975
Buildings and structures on Piccadilly

Luxury hotels